Rodrigo Pimentel (born on March 2, 1971, in Rio de Janeiro) is a former member of BOPE, the elite group of the Brazilian Military Police. Pimentel co-wrote the film Elite Squad, based on a book he co-wrote with sociologist Luiz Eduardo Soares and former BOPE captain André Batista. He is also noted to have participated in the Brazilian documentary by João Moreira Salles, News From a Personal War (Noticias de uma Guerra Particular).

References 

1971 births
Living people
Brazilian screenwriters